Suhaag (English: Husband) may refer to:

 Suhaag (1958 film)
 Suhaag (1979 film)
 Suhaag (1994 film)
 Suhaag (2015 film)